Annette Dashofy is an American author of mystery, suspense, and thriller novels.

Biography 
Dashofy was born and raised in rural Pennsylvania, where she still lives with her husband. 

After graduating from high school, Dashofy worked as an emergency medical technician for five years. She self-published her first novel, Circle of Influence, in 2014. At present, she serves at the vice president of Sisters in Crime's Pittsburgh Chapter, as well as a board member for Pennwriters.

Awards and honors 
In 2013, Dashofy received Pennwriters' Meritorious Service Award and served as the organizations' keynote speaker for their 2017 Pennwriters Conference.

Lost Legacy was a USA Today bestselling novel. In March 2017, Dasofy's debut novel, Circle of Influence, was the fifth-best selling self-published novel.

In 2021, Dashofy was the keynote speaker at Festival of Books in the Alleghenies.

Publications

Standalone novels 

 Death by Equine (2022)
 Where the Guilty Hide (2023)

Zoe Chambers Mysteries series 

 Circle of Influence (2014)
 Lost Legacy (2014)
 Bridges Burned (2015)
 With a Vengeance (2016)
 No Way Home (2017)
 Uneasy Prey (2018)
 Cry Wolf (2018)
 Fair Game (2019)
 Under the Radar (2020)
 Til Death (2020)
 Fatal Reunion (2022)

References

External links 

 Official website

Writers from Pennsylvania
21st-century American women writers